"Come On Over" is a ballad written by Barry and Robin Gibb and recorded by the Bee Gees for their album Main Course, with lead vocals by Robin, joined by Barry in the chorus of the song. A live version was recorded in Los Angeles during their Children of the World Tour and appeared on their first live album Here at Last...Bee Gees...Live. The song was more reminiscent of their older style compared to the new R&B sound of "Jive Talkin'" and "Nights on Broadway". It would become a #1 adult contemporary hit for Olivia Newton-John in 1976.

Olivia Newton-John version

In 1976 Olivia Newton-John's recorded a version and released it as the lead single from her seventh studio album of the same name. It peaked at #23 on the Billboard Hot 100 and was Newton-John's sixth #1 in a row on the Easy Listening chart, for one week in April 1976. "Come On Over" peaked at #5 on the US country chart and #3 in New Zealand.

Track listing
 "Come On Over" - 3:41
 "Small Talk and Pride" - 3:54

Charts

See also
List of number-one adult contemporary singles of 1976 (U.S.)

References

1975 songs
1976 singles
Olivia Newton-John songs
Bee Gees songs
Songs written by Barry Gibb
Songs written by Robin Gibb
Song recordings produced by Arif Mardin
Song recordings produced by John Farrar
MCA Records singles